Proagonistes mystaceus is a species of fly in the family Asilidae.

References 

Asilidae
Insects described in 1930